Rene L. Moreno (born December 26, 1969) is an American actor best known for his role as Private Joseph Ramirez in the television mini-series Band of Brothers, in 2001.

Early life
Moreno was born on December 26, 1969, in Douglas, Arizona, to Mexican parents.
He started his acting career in 1989 in a Television series named Teen Angel as Wayne. Since then, he has starred in 32 titles, most notably in Band of Brothers as Technician 5th Grade Joseph Ramirez. He has also starred in video games, such as Ghost Recon Advanced Warfighter, Ultimate Spider-Man, Call of Duty 2, and Tom Clancy's Ghost Recon Advanced Warfighter 2.

Filmography
 1989 Teen Angel as Wayne
 1990 Madhouse as Mailroom Runner
 1990 Young Guns II as Villager #2
 1993 Shadowhunter as Manny
 1995 Soldier Boyz as Raul
 1996 Bio-Dome as Partier
 1996 Murphy Brown as Bellhop
 1997 All Lies End in Murder as Markie Valesquez
 1997 Diagnosis Murder as Brian
 1998 Caroline in the City as Bullfighter
 1998 Poodle Springs as Tino
 1999 Dharma & Greg as Joaquin
 1999 Tequila Body Shots as Hector
 2000 City of Angels as Antonio Fernandez
 2001 Thieves as Chip
 2001 Band of Brothers as Joseph Ramirez
 2002 Sun Gods Dionysio
 2002 Touched by an Angel as Joaquin
 2002 Providence as Nurse 'Fig' Figueroa
 2002 ER as Ed
 2003 Robbery Homicide Division as Victor Zavala
 2002-2003 Greetings from Tucson as Manny
 2004 Last Flight Out as Salazar
 2005 Callback as Zapata Guy
 2005 Cold Case as Paulo Munoz
 2007 Heroes as 'Coyote'
 2007 Ugly Betty as Hector
 2007 CSI: Crime Scene Investigation as Adam Jiminez
 2008 Sex and the City as Felix
 2008 NCIS as Hector Cruz
 2009 Bones as Barney
 2010 Weeds as Miguel
 2015 Runner (TV Movie) as Air Marshall Hernandez
 2016 Zoobiquity (TV Movie) as Father
 2018 Chicago P.D. as Victor
 2019 Shameless as Rinaldo
 2019 Captive State as Courier

References

External links

Rene L. Moreno at Share TV.org

1969 births
Male actors from Arizona
American male film actors
American male television actors
American male actors of Mexican descent
Living people
Hispanic and Latino American male actors